"Baby's Coming Back" is a song by the American power pop group Jellyfish. It is the third single released in support of their 1990 debut album Bellybutton.

Formats and track listing 
European 7" single (CUSS 2)
"Baby's Coming Back" – 2:55
"All I Want Is Everything" (live) – 4:42

European CD single (CUST 2)
"Baby's Coming Back" – 2:55
"No Matter What" (live) – 2:50
"All I Want Is Everything" (live) – 4:42

Charts

Cover versions
English power pop band McFly released a cover version in 2007 as part of their "Baby's Coming Back/Transylvania" double A-side which topped the UK Singles Chart.

References

External links 
 

1990 songs
1990 singles
Jellyfish (band) songs
Charisma Records singles
Song recordings produced by Jack Joseph Puig
Songs written by Andy Sturmer
Song recordings produced by Albhy Galuten